Nakaibito (also known as Mexican Springs) is a census-designated place (CDP) in McKinley County, New Mexico, United States. The population was 455 at the 2000 census.

Geography
Nakaibito is located at  (35.787565, -108.807911).

Demographics

As of the census of 2000, there were 455 people, 117 households, and 91 families residing in the CDP. The population density was 66.2 people per square mile (25.5/km). There were 150 housing units at an average density of 21.8 per square mile (8.4/km). The racial makeup of the CDP was 99.12% Native American, 0.44% White, 0.22% Asian, and 0.22% from other races. Hispanic or Latino of any race were 1.54% of the population.

There were 117 households, out of which 41.0% had children under the age of 18 living with them, 44.4% were married couples living together, 28.2% had a female householder with no husband present, and 21.4% were non-families. 17.1% of all households were made up of individuals, and 7.7% had someone living alone who was 65 years of age or older. The average household size was 3.89 and the average family size was 4.52.

In the CDP, the population was spread out, with 37.8% under the age of 18, 12.5% from 18 to 24, 27.5% from 25 to 44, 14.7% from 45 to 64, and 7.5% who were 65 years of age or older. The median age was 25 years. For every 100 females, there were 97.8 males. For every 100 females age 18 and over, there were 93.8 males.

The median income for a household in the CDP was $28,068, and the median income for a family was $28,977. Males had a median income of $21,786 versus $28,188 for females. The per capita income for the CDP was $8,546. About 24.7% of families and 25.8% of the population were below the poverty line, including 18.0% of those under age 18 and 45.7% of those age 65 or over.

Education
It is in the Gallup-McKinley County Schools district.

Zoned schools are, all in Tohatchi: Tohatchi Elementary School, Tohatchi Middle School, and Tohatchi High School.

Archaeology 
Many archaeological investigations have been done in the general area of Nakaibito and the nearby community of Tohatchi.

References

Census-designated places in McKinley County, New Mexico
Census-designated places in New Mexico
Populated places on the Navajo Nation